is a Skiing video game, developed by Human Club and published by Human Entertainment, which was released exclusively in Japan in 1995.

The game was released on January 13, 1995 for the Super Famicom system in Japan. Famitsu gave it a 21 out of 40 score.

References

External links
 Waku Waku Ski Wonder Spur at MobyGames
 Waku Waku Ski Wonder Spur at superfamicom.org
 Waku Waku Ski Wonder Spur at super-famicom.jp 

1995 video games
Human Entertainment games
Japan-exclusive video games
Skiing video games
Super Nintendo Entertainment System games
Super Nintendo Entertainment System-only games
Multiplayer and single-player video games
Video games developed in Japan